Philip Eriksson (born 22 November 1991) is a Swedish professional golfer.

In 2016, Eriksson missed out on European Tour qualification after winning the first stage of Q-School. In 2018 he qualified for the South Africa-based Sunshine Tour and got his first win at the Dimension Data Pro-Am in February 2019. The win qualified him for the 2019 WGC-FedEx St. Jude Invitational.

Professional wins (7)

Sunshine Tour wins (1)

Other wins (6)
2013 Skogaby Open (Sweden)
2015 Allerum Open (Sweden)
2016 Johannesberg Open (Swedish mini-tour Future Series), Gefle Open (Swedish mini-tour Future Series), Kumla Open, (Sweden), Oakley Tour (Sweden)

Results in World Golf Championships

"T" = Tied

References

External links
Philip Eriksson on the Sunshine Tour official site

Swedish male golfers
Sunshine Tour golfers
Sportspeople from Halland County
Sportspeople from Halmstad
1991 births
Living people